DCSS could refer to

 Dame Commander of Saint Sylvester, female variant of class in one of the orders of knighthood of the Holy See
 Delta Cryogenic Second Stage
 Discontinuous Saved Segments, a rebasing method in some IBM operating systems
 Dougherty County School System
 Dungeon Crawl Stone Soup